Zdzisława Barbara Sośnicka (born 29 August 1945, in Kalisz) is a  Polish singer who became popular in the 1970s and 1980s. She was awarded a Grand Prix at the 1988 National Festival of Polish Song in Opole for her entire body of work.

Popular songs
 Dom, który mam (lyr. Jan Zalewski, mus. Marek Sewen)
 Taki dzień się zdarza raz (lyr. Jadwiga Urbanowicz, mus. Leszek Bogdanowicz, Barbara Bajer)
 Kochać znaczy żyć (lyr. Jonasz Kofta, mus. Barbara Bajer)
 Bez ciebie jesień (lyr. Jacek Bukowski, mus. Mikołaj Hertel)
 A kto się kocha w tobie (lyr. Bohdan Olewicz, mus. Andrzej Korzyński)
 Deszczowy wielbiciel (lyr. Jacek Cygan, mus. Seweryn Krajewski)
 Julia i ja (lyr. Bohdan Olewicz, mus. Marceli Trojan)
 Jak nazwać jutro bez ciebie (lyr. Janusz Kondratowicz, mus. Seweryn Krajewski)
 Żegnaj lato na rok (lyr. Bohdan Olewicz, mus. Wojciech Trzciński)
 Aleja gwiazd (lyr. Marek Dutkiewicz, mus. Romuald Lipko)
 Serce pali się raz (lyr. Marek Dutkiewicz, mus. Romuald Lipko)
 Człowiek nie jest sam (lyr. Jacek Cygan, mus. Wojciech Trzciński)
 Będzie co ma być (lyr. Marek Dutkiewicz, mus. Romuald Lipko)
 W kolorze krwi
 Naga noc
 Dobra miłość (orig. Andrzej i Eliza)
 Pamięć (Polish version of "Memory", Andrew Lloyd Webber)
 Nie czekaj mnie w Argentynie (Polish version of "Don't cry for me, Argentina", Andrew Lloyd Webber)
 Najzwyczajniej w świecie

Discography

Albums 
 1972 Zdzisława Sośnicka
 1974 Zdzisława Sośnicka 2
 1977 Moja muzyka
 1980 Odcienie samotności  2 LP
 1984 Realia
 1987 Aleja gwiazd
 1989 Serce
 1990 Musicale
 1990 Musicals
 1997 The best of Zdzisława Sośnicka
 1998 Magia Serc
 2000 Złota Kolekcja – Kochać, znaczy żyć
 2014 – Antologia - Wydanie wznowionych 10 CD
 2014 – Zaśpiewane - niewydane
 2015 - Tańcz choćby płonął świat

Singles
 1972 – Dom który mam / Codziennie pomyśl o mnie chociaż raz
 1972 – Inne łzy / Tak niewiele mogę tobie dać
 1974 – Nie ma drogi dalekiej / Taki dzień się zdarza raz
 1974 – Inne łzy / Tak niewiele mogę tobie dać
 1977 – Na nas czas / Żyj sobie sam
 1977 – Jeden świat / Kochać znaczy żyć (Sopot '77)
 1980 – Nie czekaj mnie w Argentynie / Pamiętam wczoraj
 1980 – Raz na jakiś czas / W każdym moim śnie
 1980 – Żegnaj lato na rok / Tak chciałabym twoją żoną być
 1980 – A kto się kocha w Tobie / Nuda / Chcę być z tobą sam na sam / Czy to warto
 1984 – Uczymy się żyć bez końca / Realia
 1997 - Co ma być to będzie
 2004 – Jak mamy żyć (with Tede)
 2015 - Tańcz choćby płonął świat
 2015 - Chodźmy stąd

External links
 Official webpage of Zdzisława Sośnicka
 Official Facebook of Zdzisława Sośnicka

1945 births
Living people 
Polish women singers
Musicians from Kalisz 
Recipient of the Meritorious Activist of Culture badge